Omar Federico Córdoba Quintero (born 13 June 1994) is a Panamanian footballer currently playing as a defender for Independiente de La Chorrera and the Panama national team.

Career

International career
In June 2021, Córdoba made his debut for Panama in a 2022 World Cup qualifier against Anguilla.

Honours
Tauro F.C.
Liga Panameña de Futbol: Apertura 2013

C.A. Independiente de La Chorrera
Liga Panameña de Futbol: 2018 Clausura, 2019 Clausura

References

External links
 

1994 births
Living people
Panamanian footballers
Panama international footballers
Association football defenders
Tauro F.C. players
C.A. Independiente de La Chorrera players
Sportspeople from Panama City
Liga Panameña de Fútbol players
2021 CONCACAF Gold Cup players